Takyeh-ye Olya (also Romanized as Takyeh-ye ‘Olyā and Tekeyeh-ye ‘Olyā) is a village in Chaharduli-ye Gharbi Rural District, Chaharduli District, Qorveh County, Kurdistan Province, Iran. At the 2006 census, its population was 138, in 29 families. The village is populated by Kurds.

References 

Towns and villages in Qorveh County
Kurdish settlements in Kurdistan Province